Helen Mary Geake  (born 1967) is a British archaeologist and small finds specialist. She was one of the key members of Channel 4's long-running archaeology series Time Team.

Early life and education
Geake was born in Wolverhampton in 1967 but grew up in Bath. She originally trained as a secretary. However, reading archaeology books and attending lectures by Mick Aston led her to study medieval archaeology at University College London. Subsequently, she took a DPhil at the  University of York in Anglo-Saxon cemeteries contemporary with the spectacular ship burial at Sutton Hoo. Her thesis was titled "The use of grave-goods in conversion-period England c.600-c.850 A.D." and was submitted in 1995.

Career

After university she worked as assistant keeper of archaeology at Norwich Castle Museum before joining the Portable Antiquities Scheme, first as their Finds Liaison Officer for Suffolk and then as Finds Adviser for post-Roman objects, based at Cambridge University. In 2014 she became the PAS's adviser to its voluntary finds recorders, based at the British Museum.

Geake is a member of the Department of Archaeology Advisory Board at the University of York and previously acted as a regional member of the Council of Rescue: The British Archaeological Trust.

In January 2003, she was elected a Fellow of the Society of Antiquaries of London.

Television

She first worked for Time Team in 1998 as a digger, and took part occasionally thereafter as an Anglo-Saxon specialist. She joined the frontline team of presenters, for the 2006 series and continued until 2010.

In 2012 Geake appeared in three episodes of Britain's Secret Treasures having previously appeared as an Anglo-Saxon specialist in National Geographic specials titled Saxon Gold: New Secrets Revealed (2011) and 'Saxon Gold: Finding the Hoard' (2010).

Politics
Geake stood for the Green Party in the Bury St Edmunds constituency at the 2015 General Election; she came fourth with 7.9 per cent of the vote. In the 2017 General Election she came fourth with 4.2 per cent of the vote. Geake was newly elected to the Mid Suffolk district council in the May 2019 elections; she is one of two Green party councillors for the Elmswell & Woolpit ward. She was again the Green candidate at the 2019 general election, where she polled 9,711 votes with 15.7 percent of the vote, an increase of 7,000 votes or 11.5% from the 2017 election.

Personal life
Geake is married to Angus Wainwright, the National Trust archaeologist for the East of England, with two sons and a daughter, and lives in Woolpit, Suffolk. She is a cousin of the late John E. Geake, after whom the asteroid 9298 Geake is named.

Selected publications
'Burial Practice in Seventh- and Eighth-Century England' in Martin Carver (ed.), The Age of Sutton Hoo, Boydell Press, Woodbridge, 1992. 
The Use of Grave Goods in conversion-Period England c.600-c.850, British Archaeological Reports, Oxford, 1997. 
'Why were hanging bowls deposited in Anglo-Saxon graves?' in Medieval Archaeology vol. 43, 1999.
Early Deira: Archaeological Studies of the East Riding in the Fourth to Ninth Centuries AD (editor, with Jonathan Kenny), Oxbow Books, Oxford, 2000. 
'Persistent problems in seventh-century burial', in S. Lucy and A. Reynolds (eds.), Burial in Early Medieval England, Society for Medieval Archaeology Monograph 17, W.S. Maney and Son, London, 2002. 
'The control of burial practice in Anglo-Saxon England' in Martin Carver (ed.), The Cross Goes North: : Processes of Conversion in Northern Europe, AD 300–1300, York Medieval Press, 2003.

References

External links 

  

Living people
English archaeologists
People from Wolverhampton
Fellows of the Society of Antiquaries of London
Alumni of University College London
Alumni of the University of York
Archaeologists appearing on Time Team
People educated at Bath High School for Girls
Green Party of England and Wales parliamentary candidates
British women archaeologists
People from Mid Suffolk District
British women historians
1967 births
People associated with the Portable Antiquities Scheme
Green Party of England and Wales councillors
Women councillors in England